Dååth is the fourth studio album by American death metal band Dååth, released on October 26, 2010 through Century Media Records.

Track listing

Personnel
Sean Zatorsky – vocals
Eyal Levi – guitar, producer, engineer
Jeremy Creamer – bass guitar
Emil Werstler – guitar
Kevin Talley – drums, drum engineering
Eric Guenther – keyboards 
Caleb Bingham- engineer
Mark Lewis – engineer, mixing, producer
Jason Suecof – vocal producer
Maor Appelbaum – mastering engineer

References

2010 albums
Dååth albums
Century Media Records albums
Albums produced by Mark Lewis (music producer)